Adisu Massala (Addīsū Messele, born 16 June 1961) is an Israeli politician.

Biography
Adisu Masala was born in Gondar province, Ethiopia. He made aliyah in 1980 after crossing the Ethiopia–Sudan border and boarding  a plane bound for Israel. He studied social work and mechanical engineering at Bar-Ilan University, gaining a BA and went on to work as a social worker. He also became chairman of the United Ethiopian Jewish Organisation.

Political career
Masala was elected to the Knesset in the 1996 elections on the Labor Party list. However, he was one of three MKs to break away from the party to form One Nation, led by Amir Peretz. Adisu was placed fourth on the party's list for the 1999 elections, but lost his seat as the party won only two seats. He was placed fourth on the One Nation list again for the 2003 elections, but the party won only three seats.

References

External links

1961 births
Living people
Bar-Ilan University alumni
Black Jewish members of the Knesset
Ethiopian emigrants to Israel
Ethiopian Jews
Israeli Jews
Israeli Labor Party politicians
Israeli people of Ethiopian-Jewish descent
Jewish Israeli politicians
Members of the 14th Knesset (1996–1999)
One Nation (Israel) politicians
People from Amhara Region
People from Gondar